Trio Tapestry is a studio album by American jazz saxophonist Joe Lovano released on  by ECM Records. The album was recorded in March 2018 together with pianist Marilyn Crispell and percussionist Carmen Castaldi.

Background
ECM Records has already featured Lovano in the groups of other musicians, but Trio Tapestry is his debut for the label as a band leader. The album contains eleven tracks written by Lovano.

Reception
Thomas Conrad of JazzTimes praised Lovano's performance, stating "He is known for his power and his wealth of ideas. But here, in this spare context, he deals with fewer ideas and therefore concentrates on the essential ones. It is fascinating to hear him develop diverse melodies from the stepping stones of his tunes. In this bare trio, the beauty of his musical logic is laid bare. The reverberations of his gongs add mystery and also suggest key centers for improvisation". Chris Pearson of The Times stated "Joe Lovano became famous for his exuberant, free-wheeling playing and passion for vintage modern jazz. Generating as much warmth as heat, he is among the most exciting and beloved jazz heroes of his time. Yet on this disc, his first as leader for ECM, he is a different man". Paddy Kehoe of RTE.ie added "The album [is] a wedge of sax solo in the spotlight, drums or percussion sliding stealthily in, a piano lending body and intimacy. There is a pleasing serenity about much of the album, a feeling of quiet meander driven by Crispell’s Debussy-like touches".

Track listing

Personnel
Joe Lovano – gong, tenor saxophone, tarogato
Carmen Castaldi – drums, percussion
Marilyn Crispell – piano

References

2019 albums
ECM Records albums
Joe Lovano albums
Albums produced by Manfred Eicher